Live In Tel-Aviv is a 1988 live album by the Israeli rock band, HaClique.  It was recorded at club 'Real-Time'.

Vinyl track list

Side 1 

 Kol Haemet
 Sheled Umlal
 Et Mi At Ohevet
 Ima Ani Lo Rotze Lehigamel
 Mondina
 Al Tadliku Li Ner

Side 2 

 Mastik Plastik
 Sheat Haze'evim
 Yalda Mefuneket
 Golem
 Incubator

Tape track list

Side 1 

 Olam Tzafuf
 Sheled Umlal
 Zera Nivun
 Ima Ani Lo Rotze Lehigamel
 Mondina
 Sheat Haze'evim
 Kol Ha'emet
 Soarey Haimpiriya
 Et Mi At Ohevet

Side 2 

 Al Tadliku Li Ner
 Mastik Plastik
 Kehut Chushim
 Hey Yaldon
 Ani Avud
 Yalda Mefuneket
 Yeled Mavchena
 Golem
 Incubator

References

1988 live albums